Marko Bošković (Serbian Cyrillic: Марко Бошковић; born 15 April 1982)  is a Serbian football defender.

His previous clubs were FK Trudbenik, FK Sinđelić Beograd, FK BSK Borča and FK Napredak Kruševac.

Honours
Mladost Lučani
 Serbian First League: 2013–14

External links
 
 Profile at Srbijafudbal
 Marko Bošković Stats at Utakmica.rs

1982 births
Living people
Footballers from Belgrade
Serbian footballers
FK Sinđelić Niš players
FK BSK Borča players
FK Napredak Kruševac players
FK Mladost Lučani players
Serbian SuperLiga players
Association football defenders